Portal Rock is a turret-like rock knob (1,990 m) in Queen Alexandra Range, standing 1.5 nautical miles (2.8 km) northwest of Fairchild Peak, just south of the mouth of Tillite Glacier. So named by the Ohio State University geology party (1966–67) because the only safe route to Tillite Glacier lies between this rock and Fairchild Peak.

Rock formations of the Ross Dependency
Shackleton Coast